is a Japanese football player for Suzuka Point Getters.

Playing career
Ryota Noguchi played for Kamatamare Sanuki from 2011 to 2015. In 2016, he moved to Suzuka Unlimited FC.

Club statistics
Updated to 1 January 2020.

References

External links

1986 births
Living people
Osaka Sangyo University alumni
Association football people from Kagawa Prefecture
Japanese footballers
J2 League players
Japan Football League players
Kamatamare Sanuki players
Veertien Mie players
Suzuka Point Getters players
Association football defenders